Phradonoma is a genus of beetles in the family Dermestidae, containing the following species:

 Phradonoma albonotatum Pic, 1927
 Phradonoma alium Háva, 2006
 Phradonoma amoenulum Reitter, 1889
 Phradonoma babaulti Pic, 1921
 Phradonoma borowieci Háva & Kadej, 2006
 Phradonoma buddha Háva & Kadej, 2007
 Phradonoma calliesi Peyerimhoff, 1928
 Phradonoma cercyonoides Reitter, 1887
 Phradonoma constantini Herrmann & Háva, 2005
 Phradonoma dichroum Reitter, 1900
 Phradonoma draco Háva, 2006
 Phradonoma endroedyi Háva, 2003
 Phradonoma eximium Arrow, 1915
 Phradonoma funestum Reitter, 1881
 Phradonoma haemorrhoum Gerstaecker, 1871
 Phradonoma hirsutulum Reiche in Mulsant & Rey, 1868
 Phradonoma incognitum Háva, 2006
 Phradonoma interruptum Thunberg, 1781
 Phradonoma jelineki Háva, 2006
 Phradonoma maculifasciatum Reitter, 1887
 Phradonoma magnum Herrmann & Háva, 2005
 Phradonoma monachus Háva, 2006
 Phradonoma namibicum Háva, 2005
 Phradonoma nebulosum Háva, 2006
 Phradonoma nigrum Háva, 2006
 Phradonoma nobile Reitter, 1881
 Phradonoma oculatum Háva, 2004
 Phradonoma parthicum Zhantiev, 1976
 Phradonoma piceum Háva, 2002
 Phradonoma simile Háva, 2006
 Phradonoma spectum Háva, 2006
 Phradonoma tricolor Arrow, 1915
 Phradonoma trizonatum Fairmaire, 1883
 Phradonoma turcomanicum Mroczkowski, 1960
 Phradonoma uninotatum Pic, 1942
 Phradonoma villosulum Duftschmid, 1825

References

Dermestidae genera